Diplomatic relations between Afghanistan and Japan were officially established in 1931, although early contacts date back to 1907 when the Afghan general Ayub Khan, who defeated the British in Mainland, visited Japan.

Diplomacy
Ayub Khan visited Japan as a guest of honor of Tōgō Heihachirō on February 16, 1907, where they celebrated an Asian victory against European imperialism following Japanese victory in the Russo-Japanese War. In early 1914, the Afghan King Habibullah Khan donated money, under a decree, to earthquakes that occurred in Japan, including the Senboku earthquake. Likewise, Japan was well received in Afghanistan.

Hisao Tani, a Japanese military officer, visited Afghanistan in 1922. Afghan King Amanullah Khan legislated a Treaty of Friendship between the two nations at the Japanese embassy in London. This was eventually signed on 19 November 1930. Afghanistan and Japan were originally set to create official relations in 1919, but this was intentionally delayed by the United Kingdom in British India by intercepting messages.

Afghanistan was neutral during World War II, but was close to Germany. Afghanistan was pressured by the United Kingdom and Soviet Union to expel Axis diplomats from the country, which was refused. This was, eventually, accepted in November 1941 after the war situation had changed - however contrary to expectations, the Afghans allowed the Axis (including Japanese) diplomats to remain.

In 1959, Afghan prime minister Mohammed Daoud Khan visited Japan. In 1969, King Zahir Shah and Queen Humaira visited Japan - in 1971, Crown Prince Akihito and Princess Michiko visited Afghanistan.

After the Soviet invasion in 1979, Japan closed down its embassy in Kabul and did not recognize any of the subsequent warring factions. In January 2002, Japan hosted the Tokyo Conference on which international donors pledged aid to rebuild Afghanistan. The Japanese embassy reopened in Kabul and has since engaged in various types of assistance to Afghanistan. As of 2012, Japan is the second largest donor to Afghanistan after the United States.

In June 2010, Afghan President Hamid Karzai, who was on a state visit to Japan, said that Japan would get priority on the exploration of mineral resources in Afghanistan, in return for the aid Japan has given to Afghanistan since 2002.

Culture
Similarities in the two nations have been noted in that both had historically thwarted foreign occupation, and that both have shared a title among the lines of "land of the rising sun" - for Afghanistan, this was its former name, Khorasan. Certain similar traditions have also been noted, dating back to ancient times as Zoroastrianism and Buddhism spread to the far east via Afghanistan and the Silk Road. Mahmud Tarzi saw Japan as a model for modernization and development whilst preserving traditions.

In 2004, the Japanese ambassador Kinichi Komano said of cultural similarities: "Japanese people have their own very old culture and civilization, and they are grateful to the Afghan people because of Buddhism, which entered Japan from India through Afghanistan, China and Korea. This shared history is well understood by almost all Japanese people. Also, because of the same experience or situation that the two nations had in the past century or so, that is, the complete devastation of the country – due to World War II in the case of Japan, and the civil war in Afghanistan’s case. [...] The people of Japan and the people of Afghanistan also have in common their warm hospitality to people, to their friends."

In 2016, 102 artifacts from Afghanistan that were protected in Japan during the civil war were returned to the National Museum of Afghanistan.

References

External links
 The Embassy of Afghanistan, Tokyo - website 
 Japan Ministry of Foreign Affairs: Japan-Afghanistan relations

 
Japan
Afghanistan